

The Milwaukee Brewers are a Major League Baseball (MLB) franchise based in Milwaukee, Wisconsin. Established in Seattle, Washington, as the Seattle Pilots in 1969, the team became the Milwaukee Brewers after relocating to Milwaukee in 1970. The franchise played in the American League until 1998 when it moved to the National League in conjunction with a major league realignment. As of the completion of the 2022 season, 984 players have competed in at least one game for the Brewers.

Players

References
Specific

General

Roster
Major League Baseball all-time rosters